Dew is the condensation of atmospheric water vapour into droplets.

Dew point is the air temperature at which dew will form.
Dew point depression is an atmospheric weather term in meteorology.
Dew pond, artificial pond for watering livestock

Dew or DEW may also refer to:

Places
Dew, Texas, American rural community
Dew Independent School District, American public school district that overlaps Dew, Texas
Deer Park Airport (Washington), FAA location identifier DEW

Military
Distant Early Warning Line (DEW Line), network of American radar stations
Directed-energy weapons (DEW), a type of weapon
Operation Dew, American biological warfare tests conducted 1951–53

Others
Dew (film), a 2019 Thai film

 Dew, a historic term used to refer to semen

See also
Dew (surname), for people with the name
Dewe (disambiguation)
DU (disambiguation)